The American Board of Commissioners for Foreign Missions (ABCFM) was among the first American Christian missionary organizations. It was created in 1810 by recent graduates of Williams College. In the 19th century it was the largest and most important of American missionary organizations and consisted of participants from Protestant Reformed traditions such as Presbyterians, Congregationalists, and German Reformed churches.

Before 1870, the ABCFM consisted of Protestants of several denominations, including Congregationalists and Presbyterians. However, due to secessions caused by the issue of slavery and by the fact that New School Presbyterian-affiliated missionaries had begun to support the Presbyterian Board of Foreign Missions, after 1870 the ABCFM became a Congregationalist body. 

The American Board (as it was frequently known) continued to operate as a largely Congregationalist entity until the 1950s. In 1957, the Congregational Christian church merged with the German Evangelical and Reformed Church to form the United Church of Christ. As a part of the organizational merger associated with this new denomination, the ABCFM ceased to be independent. It merged operations with other missions entities to form the United Church Board for World Ministries, an agency of the United Church of Christ.

Other organizations that draw inspiration from the ABCFM include InterVarsity Christian Fellowship, the Conservative Congregational Christian Conference, and the Missionary Society of the National Association of Congregational Christian Churches.

Organization and functioning 
The ABCFM conducted an annual meeting with a Prudential Committee (aka Executive Committee) that took care of day-to-day business. It elected a Corresponding Secretary to produce written documents, and a Treasurer to receive donations. It also had board members.

The ABCFM held its first meeting on September 5, 1810, and elected Samuel Worcester as corresponding secretary.

Corresponding Secretaries and other key leaders 
 Samuel Worcester was the first corresponding secretary, starting in 1810. 
 Jeremiah Evarts, corresponding secretary of the ABCFM from 1821 to 1831
 At the 1822 annual meeting, board members elected officers: Evarts as corresponding secretary,  John Treadwell as president, and Rev. Joseph Lyman as vice president. The Prudential Committee consisted of William Reed, Rev. Leonard Woods, Jeremiah Evarts, Samuel Hubbard, and Rev. Warren Fay.
 Elias Cornelius became corresponding secretary, serving Dec 1831 – February 1832 (his death) 
 Benjamin B. Wisner, Rufus Anderson (1796–1880) and David Greene (1797–1866) became "coequal" secretaries in 1832. When Wisner died (February 9, 1835), William Jessup Armstrong took his place. 
 Anderson, Greene, and Armstrong led as coequals from 1835 to 1846, with Anderson as foreign secretary, Armstrong as domestic secretary, and David Greene as secretary for American Indian missions and editor of the Missionary Herald Rufus Anderson continued as foreign secretary until 1866. Armstrong died in a shipwreck between Boston and New Jersey in 1846.
 Selah B. Treat was elected in 1843 as recording secretary. Rufus Anderson, Rev. David Greene, and Rev. William J. Armstrong were listed as "Secretaries for Correspondence." (President and vice president were listed respectively as Theodore Frelinghuysen LL. D.  and Hon. Thomas S. Williams) 
 By 1858, George Warren Wood was sole corresponding secretary, with Rev. Mark Hopkins as President and abolitionist William Jessup as Vice-President. Hopkins had been the President of Williams College since 1836. 
 By 1866, Rev. Nathan George Clark and Rev G. W. Wood had joined Rufus Anderson and Selah Treat as corresponding secretaries. Wood, as ABCFM Secretary in New York City, held his position from 1850 to 1871. Clark assumed the position of Foreign Secretary when Anderson left in 1866 and remained Foreign Secretary until 1894.
Note: After some secessions due to the slavery issue and the movement of New School Presbyterian-affiliated missionaries to the Presbyterian Board of Foreign Missions, the ABCFM was left as a Congregationalist body after 1870. 
 In 1896, James Levi Barton became secretary when N.G. Clark died, and he retired in 1927.
 In 1899, James L. Barton, Judson Smith, and Charles H. Daniels are the three Corresponding Secretaries of the ABCFM according to The Congregational Yearbook. It also lists Charles M. Lamson and D. Willis James as ABCFM president and vice president, respectively.
 Henry H. Riggs' brother Ernest Wilson Riggs (former president of Euphrates College 1910–1921 and Near East Relif worker) joined James Levi Barton as associate secretary and corresponding secretary of the ABCFM from 1921 to 1932.
Note: After 1930, the ABCFM revised its constitution to create the position of "Executive Vice-President" to provide a position that was "first among equals" amongst ABCFM secretaries.
 Dr. Frank Field Goodsell was the first Executive Vice-President of the ABCFM, which he led from 1930 to 1948.
Alford Carleton served as executive vice president of the board from 1954 to 1970.
Note: when the Evangelical and Reformed Church merged with the Congregational Christian Church in 1957, the Congregationalist-affiliated ABCFM merged with the E&R affiliated Board of International Missions to become the United Church of Christ denomination's United Church Board of World Ministries under Carleton On June 29, 1961, the ABCFM formally concluded. On July 1, 2000, a UCC restructure renamed UCBWM became "Wider Church Ministries" under the UCC's covenanted ministries structure.

Board members 
 Timothy Dwight
In 1826, the American Board absorbed 26 members of the United Foreign Missionary Society (UFMS) into its board.

Early history
In 1806, five students from Williams College in western Massachusetts took shelter from a thunderstorm in a haystack.  At the Haystack Prayer Meeting, they came to the common conviction that "the field is the world" and inspired the creation of the ABCFM four years later.  The objective of the ABCFM was to spread Christianity worldwide. Congregationalist in origin, the ABCFM also accepted missionaries from Presbyterian (1812–70), Dutch-Reformed (1819–57) and other denominations.

In 1812, the ABCFM sent its first missionaries – Adoniram and Ann Hasseltine Judson; Samuel and Roxana Peck Nott; Samuel and Harriet Newell; Gordon Hall, and Luther Rice—to British India.  Between 1812 and 1840, they were followed by missionaries to the following people and places: Tennessee to the Cherokee Indians, India (the Bombay area), northern Ceylon (modern day Sri Lanka), the Sandwich Islands (Hawaii); east Asia: China, Singapore and Siam (Thailand); the Middle East: (Greece, Cyprus, Turkey, Syria, the Holy Land and Persia (Iran)); and Africa: Western Africa—Cape Palmas—and Southern Africa—among the Zulus.

The fight against Indian removal
Jeremiah Evarts served as treasurer, 1812–20, and as corresponding secretary from 1821 until his death in 1831.  Under his leadership, the board in 1821 expanded the role of women: it authorized Ellen Stetson, the first unmarried female missionary to the American Indians, and Betsey Stockton, the first unmarried female overseas missionary and the first African-American missionary.

Evarts led the organization's efforts to place missionaries with American Indian tribes in the Southeastern United States.  He also led the ABCFM's extensive fight against Indian removal policies in general and the Indian Removal Act of 1830 in particular.

1830 through 1860
By the 1830s, based on its experiences, the ABCFM prohibited unmarried people from entering the mission field.  They required couples to have been engaged at least two months prior to setting sail.  To help the missionaries find wives, they maintained a list of women who were "missionary-minded": "young, pious, educated, fit and reasonably good-looking." The policy against sending single women as missionaries was not strictly followed and was reversed in 1868.
The secretary post was offered to Elias Cornelius in October 1831, but he became ill and died in February 1832. Rufus Anderson was the General Secretary of the Board from 1832 through the mid-1860s.  His legacy included administrative gifts, setting of policy, visiting around the world, and chronicling the work of the ABCFM in books.

Between 1810 and 1840, the ABCFM sought firstly to proclaim the Gospel of Jesus Christ.  At home and abroad, the Board and its supporters undertook every effort to exhort the evangelical community, to train a cadre of agents, and to send forth laborers into the mission field.  As a leader in the United Front and early federal American voluntary associations, the Board influenced the nineteenth-century mission movement.

Missionary stations in 1855 
By 1850, the American Board had sent 157 ordained, male missionaries to foreign posts.

The January 1855 issue of the Missionary Herald listed the Current missions of the Board as follow:

Africa 
 Mission to Gaboon (Baraka station, Olandebenk station, Negenenge station, one outstation at Nomba) 
 Mission to Zulus (Mapumulo station, Umvoti station, Esidumbini station, Umsunduzi station, Itafamasi station, Table Mountain station, Inanda station, Umlazi station, Ifumi station, Amahlongwa station, Ifafa station, Umtwalumi station)
Mission to Angola (Chilesso station)

Europe 
 Mission to Greece (Athens station) 
 Mission to Jews (Constantinople, Smyrna, Thessalonica)

Western Asia 
 Mission to Armenians (Bebek (Constantinople) station, Pera (Constantinople) station, Hass-keuy (Constantinople) station, Koom-kapoo (Constantinople) station, Smyrna station, Marash station, Aintab station, Talas, Turkey station, Sivas station, Tokat station, Marsovan station, Trebizond station, Ezroom station, and Arabkir station)
 Mission to Syria (Beirut station, Abeih station, Hasbeiya station, Trablous station, Aleppo station, and outstations at Bhamdoun, Kfarshima, Rashaya, Ibel, and Khiam) 
 Mission to Assyria (Mosul station, Diarbekir station, and an out-station at Hainee) 
 Mission to Nestorians (Urmia station [also known as Oroomaih] and nearby Seir station; Gawar station; and outstations at Geog Tapa, Ardeshai, Supergan, and Dizza Takha)

Southern Asia 
 Mission to Bombay (Bombay station) 
 Mission to Ahmednagar (American Marathi Mission Marathi Christians) (Ahmednuggur station, Bhingar station, Seroor station, and outstations at Wudualey, Newasse, and Dedgaum) 
 Mission to Satara (Satara station and Mahabulishwar station) 
 Mission to Kolapoor (Kolapoor station)
 Mission to Madras ( Royapoorum station, Chintadrepettah station, and Black Town station)
 Mission to Madura (Madura East station, Madura Fort station, Dindiguel East station, Dindiguel West station, Periacoolum station, Tirumungalum station, Pasumalie station, Mandahasalie station, Tirupoovanum station, and Sivagunga station)
 Mission to Ceylon (Tillipally station, Baticotta station, Oodooville station, Manepy station, Panditeripo station, Chavagacherry station, Oodoopitty station, Varany station, and outstations at Caradive, Valany, Poongerdive, Kaits, and Atchoovaley

Eastern Asia 
 Mission to Canton (Canton station)  
 Mission to Amoy (Amoy station) 
 Mission to Fuh-Chau (Fuh-Chau station) 
 Mission to Shanghai (Shanghai station)
 Mission to Hong Kong/South China (Hong Kong and Canton stations)

North Pacific Ocean 
 Mission to Micronesia (Rono Kittie station (Ascension Island), Shalong Point station (Ascension Island), Strong's Island station)  
 Mission to Hawaii (Kailua station, Kealakekua station, Hilo station, Kohala station, and Waimea station)
 Mission to Maui (Lahaina station, Lahainaluna station, Wailuku station)   
 Mission to Molokai (Kaluaaha station)  
 Mission to Oahu (Honolulu station, Punahou station, Ewa station, Waialua station, and Kaneohe station)  
 Mission to Kauai (Waimea station, Koloa station, and Waioli station)

North American Indians 
 Mission to Choctaws (Stockbridge station, Wheelock station, Pine Ridge station, Good Water station, Good Land station, Bennington station, Mount Pleasant station, Lenox station, and outstations at Mount Zion and Bok Chito
 Mission to Cherokees (Brainerd Mission, Dwight station, Lee's Creek station, Fairfield station, Park Hill station, and an outstation at Honey Creek) 
 Mission to Dakotas (Yellow Medicine station and New Hope station)
 Mission to Ojibwas (Bad River station) 
 Mission to Senecas (Upper Cattaraugus station, Lower Cattaraugus station, Upper Alleghany station, Lower Alleghany station, and an outstation at Old Town)  
 Mission to Tuscaroras (Tuscarora station and Mount Hope station) 
 Mission to Abenaquis (St. Francis station)

Recruitment efforts
Orthodox, Trinitarian and evangelical in their theology, speakers to the annual meetings of the Board challenged their audiences to give of their time, talent and treasure in moving forward the global project of spreading Christianity.  At first reflective of late colonial "occasional" sermons, the annual meeting addresses gradually took on the quality of "anniversary" sermons.  The optimism and cooperation of post-millennialism held a major place in the scheme of the Board sermons.

After having listened to such sermons and been influenced at colleges, college and seminary students prepared to proclaim the gospel in foreign cultures.  Their short dissertations and pre-departure sermons reflected both the outlook of annual Board sermons and sensitivity to host cultures.  Once the missionaries entered the field, optimism remained yet was tempered by the realities of pioneering mission work in a different milieu.  Many of the Board agents sought—through eclectic dialogue and opportunities as they presented themselves, as well as itinerant preaching—to bring the cultures they met, observed, and lived in to bear upon the message they shared.  The missionaries found the audiences to be similar to Americans in their responses to the gospel message.  Some rejected it outright, others accepted it, and a few became Christian proclaimers themselves.

Other North American Missions to the Indians
Among the North American missions of the ABCFM north or west of the displaced Southeast tribes were the 1823 Mackinaw Mission (Mackinac Island and Northern Michigan), the Green Bay mission (Michigan Territory at Green Bay), the Dakota mission (Michigan Territory/Iowa Territory/Minnesota Territory primarily along the Mississippi and the Minnesota (St. Peters) Rivers), the Ojibwe mission (Michigan Territory/Wisconsin Territory/Minnesota Territory/ Wisconsin at La Pointe and Odanah, Yellow Lake, Pokegama Lake, Sandy Lake, Fond du Lac, and Red Lake), and the Whitman mission in Oregon.

Missionaries of the Dakota mission experienced the explosion of Dakota violence in August 1862 at the start of the U.S.-Dakota War. Some of them attended the imprisoned Dakota and accompanied the exiled Dakota when they were forced out of Minnesota in 1863, especially those of the Williamson and Riggs families.

The Dakota mission translated the Bible into Dakota and produced a dictionary and a schoolbook. The Ojibwe mission translated the New Testament into Ojibwe and produced a number of schoolbooks, but used a now-abandoned notation style to do so. Both were among the first to render these languages in print.

Work with indigenous preachers
Indigenous preachers associated with the Board proclaimed an orthodox message, but they further modified the presentation beyond how the missionaries had developed subtle differences with the home leaders.  Drawing upon the positive and negative aspects of their own cultures, the native evangelists steeped their messages in Biblical texts and themes. At times, indigenous workers had spectacular or unexpected results.  On many occasions, little fruit resulted from their labors.  Whatever the response, the native preachers worked on—even in the midst of persecution—until martyrdom or natural death took them.

Native preachers and other indigenous people assisted Board missionaries in Bible translation efforts.  The act of translating the Scriptures into a mother tongue reflected a sensitivity to culture and a desire to work within the host society.  Second only to the verbal proclamation of the Gospel, Bible translation took place in all sorts of settings: among ancient Christian churches, such as the Armenians and the Assyrian [Nestorian] church; cultures with a written language and a written religious heritage, such as the Marathi; and creating written languages in cultures without them, such as among the animistic people in Hawaii.

Educational, social, and medical roles served by ABCFM missionaries
Printing and literacy played crucial roles in the process of Bible translation.  Similarly, the press runs and literacy presentations contributed significantly to the social involvement exhibited by the Board.  To a greater or lesser extent, education, medicine, and social concerns supplemented the preaching efforts by missionaries.  Schools provided ready-made audiences for preachers.  Free, or Lancasterian, schools provided numerous students.  Boarding students in missionary homes allowed them to witness Christian life in the intimacy of the family.

Education empowered indigenous people.  Mostly later than 1840, it enabled them to develop their own church leaders and take a greater role in their communities.  Board missionaries established some form of education at every station.  A number of Board missionaries also received some medical training before leaving for the field.  Some, like Ida Scudder, were trained as physicians but ordained as missionaries and concentrated on the task of preaching.  Others, such as Peter Parker, sought to practice both the callings of missionary and medical practitioner.

ABCFM in China 
After the London Missionary Society and the Netherlands Missionary Society, the Americans were the next to venture into the mission field of China. The Board of Commissioners for Foreign Missions, representing the Congregational Churches of the United States, sent out Revs. David Abeel and Elijah Coleman Bridgman in 1829.  They were received in February 1830 by Dr. Robert Morrison. These men worked first among the Chinese and Malays of the Straits Settlements. From 1842 to his death in 1846, Mr. Abeel devoted himself to establishing a mission in Amoy (modern Xiamen).

The American Board followed with many other appointments in rapid succession. Revs. Ira Tracy and Samuel Wells Williams (1812–1884), followed in 1833, settling at Singapore and Macau. In the same year Revs. Stephen Johnson (missionary) and Samuel Munson went to Bangkok and Sumatra. There were four great centers from which smaller stations were maintained. These were Fuzhou, in connection with which were fifteen churches; North China, embracing Beijing, Kalgan, Tianjin, Tengzhou, and Baoding, with smaller stations in the various districts of the center missions; Hong Kong; and Shanxi, with two stations in the midst of districts filled with opium cultivation and staffed by missionaries of the Oberlin Band of Oberlin College.

At Tengzhou missionaries established a college, over which Dr. Calvin Mateer presided. Tengzhou was one of the centers for Chinese literary competitive examinations. Mateer believed that the light of modern science shown in contrast with "superstition" would prove effective.  He and his wife taught astronomy, mathematics, natural philosophy, and history.  He trained young men to be teachers all over North China. The young men whom he had trained in Biblical instruction began native ministry.  Drs. John Livingstone Nevius and Hunter Corbett (1862–1918) co-operated in this latter work, by giving a theological education to candidates for ministry during a portion of each year at Yantai.

At its principal stations in China, the Society maintained large medical dispensaries and hospitals, boarding schools for boys and girls, colleges for native students, and other agencies for effecting the purposes of the mission. It also helped create the Canton Hospital. As of 1890 it had twenty-eight missionaries, sixteen lady agents, ten medical missionaries, four ordained native ministers, one hundred and five unordained native helpers, nearly one thousand communicants, and four hundred and fifty pupils in its schools.

ABCFM in the Middle East

The ABCFM founded many colleges and schools in the Ottoman Empire and the Balkans. For example, the American College of Sofia in Bulgaria is the successor to a Boys' School founded by the ABCFM in 1860 in Plovdiv and a Girls' School in Stara Zagora in 1863. They were combined in Samokov, Bulgaria in 1871, and moved to Sofia in the late 1920s.

Missionaries sponsored by ABCFM, listed by location

Africa

Europe

Western Asia

Southern Asia

Eastern Asia

North Pacific Ocean

North American Indians

Indigenous workers affiliated with the Board
 Babajee (b. 1791)
 Liang Fa (1789–1855)
 David Malo (1795–1853)
 Henry Opukahaia (c. 1792–1818; also known as Ōpūkahaia)
 Puaaiki (c. 1785–1844)
 Asaad Shidiak (c. 1797–c. 1832; also known as Asaad Esh Shidiak)
 Joel Hulu Mahoe (1830–1890) second full-Hawaiian to be ordained.
 Henry Blatchford, of the Ojibwe mission did translations and lay preaching beginning at Pokegama (Minnesota) in 1836, was ordained eventually and worked at the Odanah mission until he died in the late 19th century.
 Abdullah Abdul Kadir (1797-1854), known as "Munshi Abdullah", was a Malayan scholar and translator under the employ of Alfred North, an ABCFM missionary stationed in Singapore.

See also
 American Ceylon Mission
 Dan Beach Bradley (Siam, 1834, resigned 1847)
 Haystack Prayer Meeting
 History of Christian missions
 Oberlin Band (China)
 Protestant missionary societies in China during the 19th Century
 List of American Board missionaries in China
 List of Missionaries to Hawaii

References

Further reading
 Bliss, Edwin Munsell, ed. The Encyclopaedia of missions. Descriptive, historical, biographical, statistical. With a full assortment of maps, a complete bibliography, and lists of Bible version, missionary societies, mission stations, and a general index online vol 1 1891, 724pp; online vol 2 1891, 726pp
 Conroy-Krutz, Emily. Christian Imperialism: Converting the World in the Early American Republic. Ithaca, NY: Cornell University Press, 2015. 
 Phillips, Clifton Jackson. Protestant America and the pagan world: the first half century of the American Board of Commissioners for Foreign Missions, 1810–1860 (Harvard University Press, 1969)
 Putney, Clifford (writer of introduction and editor with Burlin, Paul), The Role of the American Board in the World:  Bicentennial Reflections on the Organization's Missionary Work, 1810–2010 (Eugene, Or:  Wipf and Stock, 2012)
 Strong, William Ellsworth. The Story of the American Board (1910) online[
 Varg, Paul A. Missionaries, Chinese, and Diplomats: The American Protestant Missionary Movement in China, 1890–1952 (Princeton UP, 1958).

Publications

İdris YÜCEL, "An Overview of Religious Medicine in the Near East: Mission Hospitals of the American in Asia Minor (1880-1923)", Journal for the Study of Religions and Ideologies, Vol 14, Issue 40, Spring 2015.
İdris YÜCEL, “A Missionary Society at the Crossroad: American Missionaries on the Eve of the Turkish Republic”, Journal of Modern Turkish History, Vol 8 Issue 15, Spring 2012.
İdris YÜCEL,"An Overview of Religious Medicine in the Near East: Mission Hospitals of the American Board in Asia Minor (1880-1923)", Journal for the Study of Religions and Ideologies, Vol 14, Issue 40, Spring 2015.
İdris YÜCEL, Anadolu'da Amerikan Misyonerliği ve Misyon Hastaneleri (1880-1934), TTK Yayınevi, Ankara 2017.
İdris YÜCEL, Kendi Belgeleri Işığında Amerikan Board’ın Osmanlı Ülkesindeki Teşkilatlanması, Erciyes Üniversitesi, Yüksek Lisans Tezi, 2005

External links 
 Yale Library note
 Ricci Institute page on the ABCFM in China
 Bilkent University ABCFM project
  at Nebraska State Historical Society
 American Board of Commissioners for Foreign Missions, ABC 1–91, at Houghton Library, Harvard University.
 ABCFM Collection overview at Congregational Library and Archives
 Santee Normal Training School, Woonspe Wankantu, 1881, 1882, 1884, 1885, American Board of Commissioners for Foreign Missions.

American University of Beirut
Christian missionary societies
American Board of Commissioners for Foreign Missions
 American Board of Commissioners for Foreign Missions

 American Board of Commissioners for Foreign Missions
Evangelical missionary societies
Christian missions
American Ceylon Mission
Religious organizations established in 1812
1812 in international relations
1812 establishments in the United States